Hanna Borysivna Korsun (born 15 February 1991), known professionally as Maruv (stylized in all caps), is a Ukrainian singer. She used to be part of the band Maruv from February 2017 to March 2018. It was the successor of the band The Pringlez. Later, Korsun gave an interview in which she explained that from then on she would be working on her own under the pseudonym.

Biography and creativity

Early life and The Pringlez period
The singer was born as Anna Popeliukh in the Ukrainian city of Pavlohrad. In school she studied music and dance. In 2014, she graduated in a non-musical subject from the Polytechnic Institute in Kharkiv. Despite this, Popeliukh participated and reached the final of the contest The Voice of Ukraine. She is married to Oleksandr Korsun, whom she met while studying at the institute. Oleksandr was the PR manager of The Pringlez. The team included a drummer, guitarists, a songwriter, and also a photographer and sound engineer.

In 2015, the group represented Ukraine at the New Wave competition. In addition, one of their songs – "Easy to Love" – competed in the Ukrainian selection for Eurovision 2016.

2017: Transition to Maruv and first album

In 2017, the band changed its name to Maruv. In addition to this, the group members decided to change the concept of their work. The old group name was left in the past, as well as their pop-rock performance style. They decided to leave behind their "teenage" creativity, and adapt a modern and popular style. In May 2017, the band released its debut album, Stories. It includes seven tracks written in three languages – Ukrainian, Russian, English. On 23 September 2017, the band presented the album at a concert at their hometown of Kharkiv.

2017–2018: Maruv & Boosin and Black Water
In 2017, Korsun met guitarist, DJ, and performer Mikhail Busin (also known under the pseudonym BOOSIN). Later, Korsun and the Busin co-created a label called Zori Sound. They realised that their voices were in harmony and decided to work further under the name of Maruv & Boosin. Their first joint song was "Spini". Later, they recorded a second joint song, "Drunk Groove", which became famous, even hitting the overseas charts. The track was released on 15 December 2017. Korsun was the author of the text, and Busin authored the music.

Maruv performed "Drunk Groove" at the opening of Muz-TV 2018. They gave a concert on 10 June in Moscow to mark the opening of FIFA World Cup 2018. The performance took place on Sparrow Hills. On 30 July 2018, they released a follow-up single to the lead track "Drunk Groove", titled "Focus on Me". It is the second single from their album Black Water, which was released on 28 September 2018, as a visual album.

2019–present: Eurovision Song Contest and withdrawal

On 23 February 2019, Maruv won the final of Vidbir for the Eurovision Song Contest 2019 . Her win was marred by controversy about her concerts in Russia. The rights to her Eurovision song, "Siren Song", belong to the Russian record label Warner Music Russia and the label had organised her first ever solo concert to be held in Moscow at Izvestia Hall on 6 April 2019. After it became clear that she would be performing in two concerts in Russia the following months, Vice Prime Minister and Minister of Culture Vyacheslav Kyrylenko stated that artists who toured Russia or "did not recognise the territorial integrity of Ukraine" should not take part in Eurovision.

During the final, when asked on stage whether Crimea is part of Ukraine, she replied affirmatively, and when asked if Russia was an aggressor, she replied: "If the country has a bad president, that doesn't mean that all the people who live there are evil". After the show, when Ukraine's Channel 24 asked her to describe what was happening in Donbass and her position towards it, she replied:

On 24 February the National Public Broadcasting Company of Ukraine (UA: PBC) offered Maruv a contract; one of the terms forbid her to hold concerts in Russia. Maruv saw no harm in performing in Russia claiming "performing concerts is my way of bringing peace," later she confirmed she was willing to postpone her concerts. Maruv stated that the issue of not touring in Russia was not critical to her, and the major disagreement was about other conditions of the contract which she described as a cabal. She said that she is a tax-paying citizen of Ukraine and genuinely loves her country, however she is not ready to turn her participation in the contest into the "promo-action of Ukrainian politicians". "I am a musician, not the baseball bat on the political arena", she said.

The next day it was revealed that UA: PBC and Maruv were not able to reach an agreement on her participation in the contest. Ukraine withdrew from participating in Eurovision 2019 as a result of the controversy, which they had been tipped to receive a high score. The song "Siren Song" became a huge hit in CIS countries. It received three platinum certifications in Russia. On 29 November 2019 She released EP Hellcat Story.

In 2020 Maruv presented her alter ego Shlakoblochina and released an EP Fatality under this name. She also recorded Russian version of the song "More" for the game League of Legends.

Personal life
Anna Korsun is married to Oleksandr Korsun. Korsun announced via her social media on 15 February 2022 that she is pregnant with her first child.

Discography

Studio albums 
Stories (2017)
Black Water (2018)
No Name (2021)

Extended plays
Hellcat Story (2019)
Fatality (2020)

Singles

Awards and nominations

Notes

References

External links

 
Profile on Warner Music Russia 

1991 births
Living people
People from Pavlohrad
Kharkiv Polytechnic Institute alumni
21st-century Ukrainian women singers
Ukrainian singer-songwriters
Ukrainian women poets
The Voice of Ukraine contestants
MTV Europe Music Award winners
English-language singers from Ukraine
Russian-language singers